SS Victoria Park was a general cargo steamship built in 1943, the first of 24 wartime Park Ships that were built in the Pictou Shipyard in Pictou, Nova Scotia in the 1940s. Victoria Park was built by Foundation Maritime Ltd. April 27, 1943. Built as a merchant steamship constructed for Canada’s Merchant Navy. and was originally built for the government of Canada's use as a cargo vessel.

History
The S.S Victoria Park was the first steam ship built at the new Pictou shipyard. In the tradition of naming Park Ships after Canadian parks, she was named for Victoria Park in nearby Truro, Nova Scotia. The ship was launched on April 27, 1943. She made multiple crossings of the Atlantic carrying supplies to Europe during the Battle of the Atlantic.

Victoria Park also had a long postwar career changing owners and names numerous times until it was finally scrapped in Brazil in 1982.

Other names
After the war she was sold and renamed. She was subsequently renamed a number of times:
Tatuk, 1946
Kalo, 1948
Ester, 1957
San John P., 1964
Ramsdal I, 1965
Rio Atrato, 1966

Park Ships
Park Ships were merchant steamships constructed for Canada’s Merchant Navy during World War II. Park ships were the Canadian equivalent of the American Liberty Ships and the British Fort Ships. All three shared a similar design by J.L. Thompson and Sons of Sunderland, England.

See also
Park ships

References

External links
Local newspaper article about the launch of SS Victoria Park 
Picture of the SS Victoria Park being built

1943 ships
Ships built in Nova Scotia
Fleet of the Canadian Merchant Navy
World War II merchant ships of Canada
Steamships of Canada
Naval history of Canada
Canadian Merchant Navy